The following lists events that happened during 1881 in Australia.

Incumbents

Governors
Governors of the Australian colonies:
 Governor of New South Wales – Lord Augustus Loftus
 Governor of Queensland – Sir Arthur Kennedy
 Governor of South Australia – Sir William Jervois
 Governor of Tasmania – Major Sir George Strahan
 Governor of Victoria – George Phipps, Marquess of Normanby
 Governor of Western Australia – Sir William Robinson

Premiers
Premiers of the Australian colonies:
 Premier of New South Wales – Sir Henry Parkes
 Premier of Queensland – Thomas McIlwraith
 Premier of South Australia – William Morgan till 24 June then Sir John Cox Bray
 Premier of Tasmania – William Giblin
 Premier of Victoria – Graham Berry until 9 July then James Service

Events
 28 June – The Art Gallery of South Australia opened by Prince Albert Victor, Duke of Clarence.

Census
In the mid-19th century the colonial statisticians encouraged compatibility between the colonies in their respective censuses, and in 1881 a census was held simultaneously in each of the colonies. This was part of a census of the British Empire.  The questions posed in the colonies were not uniform.

The population of Australia was 2,250,194.

Northern Territory was counted within South Australia (286,211) and was 3,451 plus 6,346 Aboriginals in settled districts.  The population of Western Australia did not include full-blood Aborigines.

The population of greater Melbourne was 282,947 and of Sydney was 224,939.

Arts and literature

Sport
 Zulu wins the Melbourne Cup

Births
 10 January - Leslie Rainey, cricketer, footballer and tennis player (died 1962).
 6 April - Frank Leslie Thomson Wilmot, Australian poet (died 1942).
 11 September - William Jolly, first Lord Mayor of Brisbane (died 1955).
 28 October - Vin Coutie, footballer (died 1951).

Deaths
 2 August - Marcus Clarke, author (born 1846)

References

 
Australia
Years of the 19th century in Australia